Rita Debbarma (born 14 January 1995) is an Indian cricketer who plays for Tripura. She made her Twenty20 debut on 4 January 2016, for Tripura in the 2015-16 Inter State Women's Twenty20 Competition.

References

External links 
 

1995 births
Living people
Indian cricketers
Tripura cricketers
Cricketers from Tripura